John Ketcham may refer to:
 John Ketcham (Indiana surveyor) (1782–1865), surveyor, building contractor, and judge
 John Ketcham (producer-director), film producer
 John C. Ketcham (1873–1941), politician from the U.S. state of Michigan
 John H. Ketcham (1832–1906), U.S. Representative from New York